K. G. Suresh is a New Delhi based senior journalist, columnist and communication specialist. He is currently serving as Vice Chancellor of Makhanlal Chaturvedi National University of Journalism and Communication, Bhopal. He is also Emeritus Professor at the Apeejay Institute of Mass Communication, New Delhi & Hony Professor with Apeejay Stya University, India's first liberal arts university.

Earlier, he has served as Director General, Indian Institute of Mass Communication – a media training institution; Senior Consulting Editor with DD News, India's public news broadcaster; Editorial Consultant with Asianet News Network; Chief Political Correspondent with Press Trust of India and Group Media Advisor to Dalmia Bharat Enterprises.

Prof Suresh is a Member of the Academic Council of the Jawaharlal Nehru University, New Delhi; Society of Satyajit Ray Film & Television Institute, Kolkata; Research Committee of Indian Council of Social Science Research; Advisory Council, The Delhi School of Journalism, University of Delhi; Academic Council, Central University of Himachal Pradesh and the School Board of Abanindranath Tagore School of Creative Arts and Communication Studies, Assam University, Silchar. He is a Member of the Awards Selection Committee of the National Council for Science and Technology Communication, Department of Science and Technology.

Career
As DG, IIMC, Mr Suresh gave a major push to Indian language journalism at the institute introducing Marathi and Malayalam Journalism from its Amravati, Maharashtra and Kottayam, Kerala campus respectively, besides upgrading the certificate programme in Urdu at Delhi campus to a full-fledged Post Graduate Diploma Programme. In collaboration with Shri Lal Bahadur Shastri Rashtriya Sanskrit Vidyapeeth, IIMC has now introduced a three-month Advanced Certificate Programme in Sanskrit Journalism. He has also set up the Department of Indian Language Journalism apart from the Department of New Media.

His other major initiatives included the establishment of the Community Radio Empowerment & Resource Centre at IIMC with a view to promote Community Radio Stations in India and the National Media Faculty Development Centre for training and skill upgradation of media educators across India. He is also credited with reviving IIMC's peer-reviewed quarterly journal 'Communicator' and its Hindi version 'Sanchar Madhyam' as also the publication wing of the Institute besides co-hosting the prestigious 15th Asia Media Summit in New Delhi & hosting the 17th Indian Science Communication Congress at IIMC in December 2017 and first ever inter-University youth festival 'Media Mahakumbh' at IIMC in Feb 2018.

As Senior Consulting Editor with Doordarshan News, Mr Suresh played a pivotal role in introducing innovative programmes including Speed News, Vaartavali- The world's first Sanskrit Television News Magazine, Good News India – positive news from across the country, India First – A strategy and defence based programme and 'Do Touk' – a political debating platform, besides DD's first android enabled Mobile App.

Serving PTI in different capacities for over a decade including as Chief Crime Reporter, Deputy Chief Reporter, Special Correspondent and Chief Political Correspondent, Suresh has travelled across India and the world to cover developments including the Royal Palace Massacre in Nepal, BJP leader L K Advani's controversial visit to Pakistan, the post Taliban situation in Afghanistan, the cyclone, earthquake and violence in Gujarat, militancy in Kashmir apart from Lok Sabha and State Assembly elections. He has also covered both Houses of Parliament extensively.

A media educator for the last two decades, Prof Suresh is Visiting Professor/Course In Charge for Communication Skills at the Special Centre for Disaster Research at Jawaharlal Nehru University, Adjunct Professor with the Academy of Scientific & Innovative Research, an institution of National Importance established by an act of Parliament. He has also served as Adjunct Professor at the Makhanlal Chaturvedi National University of Journalism and Visiting Professor with the Delhi Institute of Heritage Research & Management, run by Govt of NCT Delhi.  He is a Resource Person for the Training Programmes at Indian Institute of Public Administration; Consortium for Educational Communication, UGC; Centre for Professional Development in Higher Education, University of Delhi; National Institute of Disaster Management, National Academy of Broadcasting and Multimedia (Prasar Bharati), Indira Gandhi National Forest Academy, Indian Aviation Academy & Research and Information System for Developing Countries (RIS), a think tank of the Ministry of External Affairs, Government of India. He is a Visiting Faculty at the Sardar Patel College of Communications & Management, Bharatiya Vidya Bhavan, New Delhi.

Achievement
Suresh was designated Commonwealth Youth Ambassador for Peace by Commonwealth Youth Programme, Asia.

With a rich professional cross-media experience of about three decades, Suresh is the recipient of Prem Bhatia Fellowship for Research in Media by Young Journalists. A post-Graduate in Mass Communications, Mr Suresh successfully completed a Public Health Journalism Experiential Course at the University of Oxford, United Kingdom.

In December 2017, Prof Suresh was conferred with the PRSI Leadership Award, the highest Award for outstanding contribution to the Public Relations profession, at the 39th All India Public Relations Conference at Visakhapatnam, Andhra Pradesh. He has also been honoured with the Visionary Leader in Media Education Award instituted by Business World Magazine & Exchange4media in November 2018; the first Khwaja Gareeb Nawaz Award for Unity, Brotherhood & Communal Harmony & Lifetime Achievement Award for contribution in the field of Media Education by NISCORT Media School & Eureka Publications

In December 2017, Suresh was conferred with the PRSI Leadership Award, the highest Award for outstanding contribution to the Public Relations profession, at the 39th All India Public Relations Conference at Visakhapatnam, Andhra Pradesh. He has also been honoured with the Visionary Leader in Media Education Award instituted by Business World Magazine & Exchange4media in November 2018; the first Khwaja Gareeb Nawaz Award for Unity, Brotherhood & Communal Harmony & Lifetime Achievement Award for contribution in the field of Media Education by NISCORT Media School & Eureka Publications

A TEDx Speaker, Suresh was a Member of the prestigious feature film jury & non-fiction jury of Indian Panorama 2018 & 2017 respectively for the International Film Festival of India, headed by well known filmmakers Rahul Rawail & Sudhir Mishra, Feature film section of National Film Awards Jury 2017 headed by noted filmmaker Priyadarshan and the Chairman of its Northern Regional Jury. He was Editor-in-Chief and Member of the International Jury for the Media Colloquium at the prestigious Delhi Sustainable Development Summit -2015, and the only journalist to represent India at the World Media Conference in Seoul in March 2015, organized by leading US daily, The Washington Times. Suresh was on the international jury for the Plural+ International Youth Video Festival 2012, organised by the United Nations Alliance of Civilizations and the International Organisation for Migration. He was the first Indian to be nominated as a jury since the inception of the festival in 2009.

He has served as Chairman, Review Committee for the 10th edition of National Science Film Festival of India (NSFFI) scheduled at Agartala, Tripura in February, 2020 & Chairman (Environment category), Prakriti film festival 2020 organized by Consortium for Educational Communication, UGC, Govt of India.

Prof Suresh chaired the international jury of the 4th Woodpecker International Film Festival-2016, India's premier festival focusing on issue-based cinema and the jury of the 13th edition of the We Care International Film Festival on disability issues 2016. He was on the jury of the National Media Award 2016 instituted by Election Commission of India, CMS-UNICEF Media Fellowship-2016, the National Awards for Excellence in Journalism instituted by the Press Council of India, the UNICEF Radio4child awards 2016, Public Relations Society of India National Awards-2016 & the prestigious Laadli Media and Advertising Award for Gender Sensitivity 2014-15, organized by Population First  and SCOPE Corporate Communication Excellence Awards 2017 & 2019.

Suresh has addressed national and international conferences including the prestigious Jhabarmal Annual Lecture organized by Rajasthan Patrika and the Sat Paul Sahni Memorial Lecture organized by the Indian Institute of Public Administration in January 2017, the Anna Endowment Lecture at Anna University, Chennai, in January 2019; Indian Youth Parliament, Jaipur 2017 and Jaipur Youth Festival 2018, International Co-Production Conference at Seoul, South Korea, June 2018, organized by the Korea Communication Commission, the 3rd National Teachers' Congress at MIT World Peace University, Pune in January 2019, keynote address on human rights at the LAWASIA International Conference in New Delhi, the Battle of Ideas panel discussion organized by the UK-based Institute of Ideas and the British Council, India, the India-Japan Global Partnership Summit in Tokyo, September 2011, the Fourth Forum of the UN Alliance of Civilizations (UNAOC) at Doha, Qatar in December 2011, the Fifth Forum of UNAOC at Vienna, Austria, Asian Youth Leaders' Summit, New Delhi, October 2013, 16th World Sanskrit Conference, Bangkok, June 2015 & World Hindi Conference, Mauritius 2018 besides chairing the session on 'Public Policy and Well Being' under the aegis of Indian Council of Social Science Research and University of Lausanne at Basel, Switzerland, September 2017.

He has extensively travelled across India and the world including Afghanistan, Pakistan, China, Nepal, Sri Lanka, Indonesia, South Korea, Japan, United Kingdom, Switzerland, Austria, Hungary, Qatar, Mauritius, South Africa among others.

References

Indian male journalists
Living people
Indian reporters and correspondents
1968 births